Joseph Fitzpatrick (born 4 December 1994) is a professional boxer from Northern Ireland. As an amateur he won a silver medal at the 2014 Commonwealth Games as a lightweight.

Amateur career

Commonwealth Games result
Glasgow 2014
Round of 16: Defeated Qhobosheane Mohlerepe (Lesotho) 2–1
Quarter-finals: Defeated  Nicholas Okongo Okoth (Kenya) 3–0
Semi-finals: Defeated Michael Alexander (Trinidad and Tobago) 3–0
Final: Defeated by Charlie Flynn (Scotland) 3–0

Professional boxing record

References

External links

1994 births
Living people
Male boxers from Northern Ireland
Lightweight boxers
Southpaw boxers
Commonwealth Games silver medallists for Northern Ireland
Boxers at the 2014 Commonwealth Games
Boxers from Belfast
Commonwealth Games medallists in boxing
Medallists at the 2014 Commonwealth Games